Dzintars Ābiķis (born 3 June 1952 in Ventspils) is a Latvian politician and a Deputy of the Saeima since 1993. He is a member of the People's Party.

References

1952 births
Living people
People from Ventspils
Latvian Green Party politicians
Latvian Way politicians
People's Party (Latvia) politicians
Society for Political Change politicians
New Unity politicians
Deputies of the Supreme Council of the Republic of Latvia
Deputies of the 5th Saeima
Deputies of the 6th Saeima
Deputies of the 7th Saeima
Deputies of the 8th Saeima
Deputies of the 9th Saeima
Deputies of the 10th Saeima
Deputies of the 11th Saeima
University of Latvia alumni